There are many birds that are active nocturnally. Some, like owls and nighthawks, are predominantly nocturnal whereas others do specific tasks, like migrating, nocturnally.
 North Island brown kiwi, Apteryx mantelli
Black-crowned night heron, Nycticorax nycticorax
 Nightingale
 Nightjar

See also
Crepuscular, a classification of animals that are active primarily during twilight, making them similar to nocturnal animals.
Diurnality, plant or animal behavior characterized by activity during the day and sleeping at night.
Cathemeral, a classification of organisms with sporadic and random intervals of activity during the day or night.
Matutinal, a classification of organisms that are only or primarily active in the pre-dawn hours or early morning.
Vespertine (biology), a classification of organisms that are only or primarily active in the evening.
Circadian rhythm
Chronotype
List of nocturnal animals

References

References
 

Nocturnal birds